Sebezhskoye or Sebezh (Себежское озеро) is a freshwater lake in the southwest of Pskov Oblast in Russia, close to the borders with Latvia and Belarus. The lake takes its name from Sebezh, a town sitting on a low-lying promontory jutting out into the lake.

In 1996, the lake basin with a cluster of similar lakes was designated the Sebezhsky National Park.

The biggest tributary of the lake is the Cherneya River, which drains into Lake Sebezhskoye from the east. The outflow of the lake is the Ugarinka River which flows to the west and crosses a narrow, several hundred meters wide, stretch of land separating Lake Sebezhskoye and Lake Orono, another big lake in the area. Both lakes belong to the drainage basin of the Daugava.

References 

Sebezh
LSebezh